Wendy Playfair (born 28 August 1926) is an Australian radio, television and film character actress, best known for her roles in television serials.

Playfair started her career in radio serials, but became best known for her brief stint in TV serial Prisoner as inmate Minnie Donovan. Other important roles were in the television series Home and Away and the film Accidents Happen starring Geena Davis.

Family
Playfair was born in Woollahra, Sydney, New South Wales to Edmund Strathmore Creer (Strath) Playfair (1894–1965) and Kathleen Ryrie (Babs) née Campbell (1899–1989). She was the third of four sisters. The Playfair family were well-to-do, socially prominent and in the meat trade. She married James Williams at All Saints Anglican Church on 6 July 1951. She is a direct descendant of the famous Sydney butcher, politician and philanthropist Thomas Playfair, and the niece of politician Thomas Alfred John Playfair. Playfair is the cousin of Olympic silver medalist Judy Playfair and the grandmother of Kip Williams, who is the current Artistic Director of the Sydney Theatre Company.

Career
Playfair started her career in radio where she worked for the ABC and consistently in morning serials for Grace Gibson, as well as in many radio plays. Playfair received the radio Macquarie Award. Prior to television she had also appeared in a few stage roles, but was best known as a radio performer  
 
She has been a staple on the small screen in character roles since 1960, when she appeared in the TV adaptation of a production of the play The Slaughter of St Theresa's Day.
 
Playfair has primarily appeared in cameo roles, with guesting roles in series starting from the late 1960s until 2013 such as Homicide, Hunter,  The Young Doctors, Return to Eden, Spirited,  Rake and Packed to the Rafters
 
However she has had several parts as different characters in serials A Country Practice (three roles), Home and Away (two roles) and  All Saints (two roles).  
 
She also has had parts in telemovies and film's her credits include Ride a Wild Pony, the only Walt Disney film ever produced in Australia and a pivotal role in the film Accidents Happen opposite Gina Davis in 2009.

Filmography

References

External links
 

1926 births
Living people
Actresses from Sydney
Australian film actresses
Australian soap opera actresses
People educated at Ascham School
20th-century Australian actresses
21st-century Australian actresses